The Eastern Interconnection is one of the two major alternating-current (AC) electrical grids in the North American power transmission grid.  The other major interconnection is the Western Interconnection. The three minor interconnections are the Quebec, Alaska, and Texas interconnections.

All of the electric utilities in the Eastern Interconnection are electrically tied together during normal system conditions and operate at a synchronized frequency at an average of 60 Hz. The Eastern Interconnection reaches from Central Canada eastward to the Atlantic coast (excluding Quebec), south to Florida, and back to the western Great Plains (excluding most of Texas).

Interconnections can be tied to each other via high-voltage direct current power transmission lines (DC ties), or with variable-frequency transformers (VFTs), which permit a controlled flow of energy while also functionally isolating the independent AC frequencies of each side. The Eastern Interconnection is tied to the Western Interconnection with six DC ties, to the Texas Interconnection with two DC ties, and to the Quebec Interconnection with four DC ties and a VFT.

In 2016, National Renewable Energy Laboratory simulated a year with 30% renewable energy (wind and solar power) in 5-minute intervals. Results show a stable grid with some changes in operation.

Electricity demand
The North American Electric Reliability Corporation (NERC) reported in 2008 the following actual and projected consumption for the regions of the Eastern Interconnection (all figures in gigawatts):

See also
Northeast blackout of 1965
Northeast blackout of 2003

References

Further reading
 
 
 Current projects 

 
Electric power transmission systems in the United States
Wide area synchronous grids
Electric grid interconnections in North America